The Kia Soul EV (also known as Kia e-Soul) is an all-electric subcompact crossover SUV manufactured by Kia and based on the Kia Soul.  The US Environmental Protection Agency (EPA) official range for the 2020 Kia Soul EV is 243 miles (391 km).

Deliveries of the first generation began in South Korea in May 2014. European sales began in July 2014.  Sales started in the U.S. in October 2014; initially it was sold only in California, Oregon, and several Eastern states with the largest EV markets and infrastructure including New York, New Jersey and Maryland. Global sales exceeded the 10,000 unit milestone in January 2016, with Europe as the leading market with 6,770 units sold. Germany was the leading European market with 3,853 units sold through December 2015.

A second generation was introduced in 2019 for the 2020 model year, sold in both Europe and Canada. It was delayed until 2021 for the US market.

History
In 2013, Kia began testing prototype versions of a Soul electric vehicle. In November 2013, Kia announced they would be producing a Soul EV and that it would go on sale in 2014. 
The vehicle was unveiled at the 2014 Chicago Auto Show.  The first-generation Soul EV was based on the second-generation Kia Soul.

First generation
The first-generation Soul EV was powered by a 27 kWh  lithium-ion polymer battery pack and 30 kWh for 2018 model year. It is capable of 100 kW DC CHAdeMO rapid charging. The motor is rated at 81.4 kW (109 bhp) and 285 Nm (210 lb.-ft).

For the 2018 model year, Kia announced a small 11% battery upgrade. By adding 8 cells to the pack, the usable cell capacity increased from 37.5 Ah to 40 Ah out of 42.4 Ah, increasing the battery pack storage capacity to 30 kWh.

Second generation

For the 2020 model year, Kia announced a significant battery upgrade to a 64 kWh LiPo battery pack, doubling capacity and range from the previous generation. With a redesign, the EV will be the only variant to be offered in Europe while only the gasoline version is offered in the US for MY2020 and onwards.   Both gasoline and EV versions continue to be offered in Canada. 

The motor is rated at 201 hp.

This vehicle is the third in the series of long range EVs put on the market by Hyundai-Kia, after the Hyundai Kona Electric and the Kia Niro EV.

Specifications

Range

Production and sales

First generation

Production of the Soul EV began in South Korea in April 2014. Pricing in the South Korean market started at 42 million won (~), before a 50% government subsidy. Kia set a global sales target of 5,000 units for 2014. Deliveries began in South Korea in May 2014, with 38 units delivered.

On June 12, 2014, Kia began production of the Soul EV for export. The first vehicles off the production line went to select European countries. European retail deliveries began in July 2014.

Sales started in the U.S. in October 2014 as 2015 model year.  Initially it was sold only in California, but in March 2015, Kia Motors North America announced the Soul EV would be available in Georgia in the second quarter of 2015, and Washington, Oregon, Hawaii and Texas would receive the EV later in the year. 2016 Kia Soul EVs began sales in Washington state in late July 2015. It was available in two trims, with pricing starting at  before any applicable government incentives.

In November 2014, the Kia Soul EV went on sale in the UK for £24,995 after the government's £5,000 Plug-in Car Grant.

Kia announced the 2016 Soul EV would come in three trims: EV-e, EV, and EV+. The EV-e was only available in California. A Sun & Fun package on the EV+ added a sunroof, and lighting for the speakers and interior. Other minor changes and colors were introduced.

Global sales passed the 5,000 unit mark in August 2015, of which 1,177 were sold in South Korea. The 10,000 unit milestone was reached in January 2016, with Europe as the leading market with 6,770 units sold, followed by South Korea with 1,580, and the United States with 1,411. , the leading European markets were Germany with 3,853 units sold, and Norway with 1,637 units.

During 2015, 2,044 Soul EVs were imported to Norway as used cars. The magazine Der Spiegel claimed that Kia registered the cars in Germany and then shipped them to Norway, which does not belong to the European Union. This legal loophole helped the Hyundai-Kia Group lower its average  fleet emissions, avoiding a hefty fine.

Second generation
The 2020 Kia Soul EV costs 319,900 NOK (US$ 36,600) in Norway, less than its internal competitor, the Hyundai Kona Electric and considerably less than the larger Kia Niro EV (another potential competitor, the Chevrolet Bolt, is no longer imported to Europe via official channels).

With demand for EVs reportedly exceeding battery supply, Hyundai-Kia decided to divert batteries to the production of the more expensive Kia Niro (the Niro and the Soul share the same battery), which was the claimed reason for limiting Soul EV production and delaying  entry into the US market until 2021.

The Soul EV is the only variant of the Soul sold in Europe. In the first ten months of 2020, European sales totaled 6,768 units.

Marketing
For the 2014 SEMA Show, Kia Motors unveiled a custom Soul EV with a red and white Smitten Ice Cream livery and a refrigerated trailer.

In August 2014, Kia Motors introduced the 2015 Soul EV hamster commercial featuring "Animals" by Maroon 5.

See also
Kia Ray EV
Kia Soul
Electric car use by country
Government incentives for plug-in electric vehicles
List of modern production plug-in electric vehicles
Plug-in electric vehicle

Notes

References

External links

 A trace of the consumption of a Kia Soul EV 2016.
 

Production electric cars
Soul EV
Mini sport utility vehicles
Crossover sport utility vehicles
Cars introduced in 2014